The Snowbird Mountain Lodge is an historic hotel property in rural Graham County, North Carolina. The main lodge was designed by Asheville architect Ronald Greene, and was built in 1940–1941 for Arthur and Edwin Wolfe; it was one of the last of a series of architecturally significant mountain lodges built in the region in the first half of the 20th century. The property features commanding views of the surrounding Nantahala National Forest and Lake Santeetlah.

The lodge was listed on the National Register of Historic Places in 1993.

See also
National Register of Historic Places listings in Graham County, North Carolina

References

External links
Snowbird Lodge web site

Hotel buildings on the National Register of Historic Places in North Carolina
Historic districts on the National Register of Historic Places in North Carolina
Hotel buildings completed in 1941
Buildings and structures in Graham County, North Carolina
National Register of Historic Places in Graham County, North Carolina
1941 establishments in North Carolina